Dietmar Johann Wolfgang "Didi" Hamann (born 27 August 1973) is a German professional football coach, former player and media personality.

Throughout his career, he has played for Bayern Munich, Newcastle United, Liverpool and Manchester City primarily in a defensive midfield position. He also spent time at Milton Keynes Dons as a player/coach before joining Leicester City as a first team coach. He was a member of the German national team from 1997 until 2006 and represented his nation in two FIFA World Cups and two UEFA European Championships, reaching the 2002 FIFA World Cup Final. He is known in Ireland as a football pundit on Raidió Teilifís Éireann's live coverage of major European and International competitions.

Throughout his playing career Hamann gained a reputation for being a highly consistent and reliable player. He is highly respected by supporters of Liverpool due in large part to his involvement in the club's victory in the 2005 Champions League final.

On 5 July 2011, Hamann was named as the new manager of Stockport County, replacing former manager Ray Mathias. He resigned from the post on 7 November 2011 after only four months with Stockport struggling in 17th place in the Conference Premier citing failure of a proposed takeover by Tony Evans.

Club career

Early career
Hamann began his career at the little-known FC Wacker München. After impressing as a junior, he joined Bayern Munich as a 16-year-old in 1989 and debuted for the Bayern professional team in 1993. Hamann joined a team led by Lothar Matthäus, Thomas Helmer, Christian Ziege and Oliver Kahn and played five games, mostly as a right winger. At first, Hamann was only a so-called Vertragsamateur (i.e. an amateur player who had the licence for playing professional games). Still, he won his first German championship as a bench player. In the next season, Bayern suffered a major injury wave which claimed midfielders Matthäus, Swiss international Alain Sutter, talent Dieter Frey and veteran Markus Schupp, which allowed Hamann to become a regular; he played 30 Bundesliga games and established himself as a valuable role player, playing either right wing or defensive midfield. He earned himself a full professional contract and was an important player in the tumultuous 1995–96 campaign, in which Bayern recruited striker Jürgen Klinsmann, coach Otto Rehhagel and midfielders Andi Herzog, Thomas Strunz and Ciriaco Sforza, but the team was torn apart by heavy internal struggles. Although Hamann was overshadowed by these new midfield recruits, he played in 20 games and provided some stability for the infighting Bayern squad. Bayern ended a disappointing second and saw Rehhagel sacked, but ended the season by winning the UEFA Cup.

The 1996–97 season was to become Hamann's breakthrough. After being a bench player most of his career until then, new coach Giovanni Trappatoni made him a starting defensive midfielder, and new recruit Mario Basler took the right wing. Hamann played in 23 games, also making his debut in the German national team and won his second German championship with Bayern. In private life, Hamann had to overcome a scary period when he broke down unconscious and was diagnosed with a stroke, but made a full recovery. The next season ended disappointingly for Bayern who lagged behind newly promoted 1. FC Kaiserslautern for the vast majority of the season and finished second. Now an undisputed starter, Hamann played in 28 games and scored two goals. The season ended on a high for Bayern when they secured the DFB-Pokal against MSV Duisburg.

Newcastle United
After playing for his country in the 1998 World Cup, he joined Newcastle United, managed at the time by Kenny Dalglish, for £5.5 million. Overcoming an early foot injury, Hamann played in 31 matches and scored five goals. In July 1999 he opted to join Gerard Houllier's Liverpool, who signed him for £8 million.
Whilst at Newcastle he played in the 1999 FA Cup Final.

Liverpool
Hamann established himself as an influential midfielder for Liverpool throughout his seven years at the club.  All in all, Hamann played in 191 league games and scored eight goals. In the 2000–01 season, Hamann won his first big English trophy when Liverpool won a much-celebrated cup treble (League Cup, FA Cup and UEFA Cup) and a place in the Champions League. Hamann also played the full 90 minutes and assisted Liverpool's second goal (scored by Michael Owen) in the team's 2-0 victory over Manchester United in the 2003 Worthington Cup final.

Hamann established himself as a major first team player for Liverpool throughout his first few seasons.

Hamann played a major part in the 2005 Champions League Final win over A.C. Milan. Although he was suffering a broken toe during the final, Hamann's substitution for Steve Finnan at half time was the catalyst for Liverpool's historic fightback. The team rallied after being 3–0 down to bring the game back to 3–3 and finally won in the penalty shootout; Hamann also showed a great amount of composure and bravery, as he took and converted the first LFC penalty with his broken foot. This was not the only key part he played in their Champions league success. Earlier in the tournament, Hamann had been forced to stand in for Liverpool's key player Steven Gerrard in the first leg of the last 16 round against Bayer Leverkusen. He excelled in the match and scored a late free-kick as Liverpool won the match 3–1.

Hamann won the FA Cup with Liverpool in May 2006, coming on as a substitute in the second-half.  He more than played his part in another trophy win for the Reds, who were 3–2 down to West Ham United at the time he came on.  Steven Gerrard scored an injury-time leveller for Liverpool to take the match to extra-time.  Liverpool would go on to win the Cup on penalties after a goalless extra-time. Once again, Hamann scored the first penalty in the shoot-out.

Manchester City

In June 2006, Hamann was given permission to talk to Bolton Wanderers about a potential transfer to the North West club. Hamann admitted that he would be saddened to leave Liverpool but would make "the best decision for my future". Hamann actually signed a pre-contract in June 2006, to become a Bolton Wanderers player but had a "change of heart". He joined Bolton for less than one day before a move to Manchester City.

On 12 July, he instead signed for Manchester City, with City agreeing to pay £400,000 compensation to Bolton. On 13 February, he signed a contract until the end of the 2008–09 season and scored his first goal for the club in a UEFA Cup qualifying first round match against EB/Streymur.

However, on 28 August 2013 during Colin Murray's morning radio show with TalkSport Bolton Wanderers chairman Phil Gartside announced that the club had never officially signed the midfielder and that the necessary papers were "just put in the draw". A Premier League investigation found that this wasn't the case and that Bolton had indeed signed Hamann, and expressed confusion as to why Gartside had lied about it.

On 1 July 2009, he was released by Manchester City as his contract expired. Hamann announced on 16 July that he intended to stay in England.

On transfer deadline day in September 2009, BBC Sport quoted Hamann as stating: "Yes, Sven [-Göran Eriksson] phoned me the other day to see if I wanted to sign for Notts County, but I said I wasn't interested at the moment as I feel I can still play at a higher level. There are a couple of things in Germany and I'll make my mind up by the end of the week. I have spoken to a couple of teams in England but that hasn't come to anything yet. Obviously, I can still sign after the deadline so maybe if teams don't get the players they want today then I will hear something".

Milton Keynes Dons
On 20 May 2010, Hamann signed a one-year contract as a player-coach at Milton Keynes Dons but only made 12 appearances as a player. When he left the club on 3 February 2011 to join Leicester City as a First Team Coach, he effectively retired from a playing career.

Comeback as player with TuS Haltern
After retiring in February 2011 and managing Stockport County in July 2011, Hamann went back to playing football, and this time for amateur-side TuS Haltern. He signed a contract with the club on 7 March 2015 at the age of 41.

International career
Hamann played for Germany at under-21 level before making his full international debut in a friendly against South Africa in November 1997. He was selected by manager Berti Vogts for the 1998 FIFA World Cup, being, at almost 25, the second youngest player in an over-aged Germany squad. During the group stage, Hamann drifted in and out of the starting XI, finally breaking into the team when Germany gained momentum in the second round game against Mexico. However, after a quarter-final defeat against Croatia, Germany was out of the tournament.

During the UEFA Euro 2000 qualifying, Hamann established himself as a key player for a transitional Germany side. He played in all of Germany's games at the final tournament as they exited in the first round. Hamann was the last player to score at the old Wembley Stadium before its demolition when he scored the winning goal in Germany's 2002 World Cup qualifier against England in October 2000.

Alongside Michael Ballack and Bernd Schneider, Hamann was one of the key players in Germany's surprising run to the 2002 FIFA World Cup Final. He became only the second Liverpool player after Roger Hunt in 1966 to play in a World Cup Final while still at the club, but finished on the losing side as Brazil won 2–0 in Yokohama. In the 67th minute of that match, Hamann lost the ball to opposing forward Ronaldo, who passed to Rivaldo, who shot from outside the area; goalkeeper Oliver Kahn gave a rebound, allowing Ronaldo to score and give Brazil a 1–0 lead. The subsequent Euro 2004 turned out to be Hamann's last tournament. Again, the Euro ended with a disappointing first round exit for Germany. A 1–2 defeat against a Czech Republic side resting its key players proved to be Hamann's penultimate international game.

After a strong performance in the 2005 Champions League final, Hamann was recalled for the Germany squad by new manager Jürgen Klinsmann. In the 2–2 draw against the Netherlands, Hamann produced a lacklustre performance, apparently convincing Klinsmann that he did not possess the required pace for that kind of level anymore. Hamann was dropped from the squad for the subsequent friendlies. Having not been selected for the German squad in the 2006 FIFA World Cup, he decided to officially retire from international football.

Coaching and management career

Milton Keynes Dons and Leicester City

On 20 May 2010, Hamann signed a one-year contract as a player-coach at Milton Keynes Dons. He left the club on 3 February 2011 to join Leicester City as a First Team Coach.

Stockport County 
On 5 July 2011, Hamann was appointed as the new manager of newly relegated Conference Premier club Stockport County, replacing Ray Mathias.  His appointment was made after businessman Tony Evans headed a consortium proposing taking over the club. In his first league game in charge of Stockport, Hamann's side drew 1–1 with Forest Green Rovers at The New Lawn. The match was broadcast live on Premier Sports. Hamann resigned as Stockport County boss on 7 November 2011, citing the failure of the proposed takeover by Tony Evans to materialise; his team were languishing in 17th place having taken only three wins from his nineteen league games in charge.

Broadcasting career
Hamann was enlisted by RTÉ Sport for their squad of pundits ahead of the 2010 FIFA World Cup in South Africa. He returned to RTÉ's team during UEFA Euro 2012 and the 2014 FIFA World Cup in Brazil.

More recently, in neighbouring Britain, Hamann has guested as a pundit on the BBC's Match of the Day 2. He has also appeared on Sky Sports's football coverage as a pundit, usually when the match involves a club he has played for, most commonly Liverpool, and has also appeared regularly on LFC TV during their live pre-game and post game analysis of Liverpool home games from Anfield.

He was again part of RTÉ Sport's studio coverage for the finals of UEFA Euro 2016, beginning with an appearance for the opening night match between tournament hosts France and Romania. In assessing Ireland's chances for the tournament, Hamann also said he had been in Dublin to see Ireland beat world champions Germany during the qualifying campaign.

He was additionally retained by RTÉ Sport as a studio pundit for Champions League and Irish International games for the full football season 2016–2017, having been an occasional pundit on Champions League matches during the 2015-16 season.

He was back on the RTÉ Panel again for the 2018 FIFA World Cup, the rescheduled UEFA Euro 2020 in 2021 and the 2022 FIFA World Cup.

Hamann also works as a pundit for Sky Sports Bundesliga in Germany.

Writing
Hamann is also the European columnist for twentyfour7 Football Magazine, where he passes regular comment on the progress and state of the game on the continent.

He released his autobiography, '′The Didi Man: My love affair with Liverpool′' co-written with Malcolm McClean, in February 2012 and it became a Sunday Times Best Seller.

Personal life
Hamann has two daughters, Chiara and Luna. He is the brother of Matthias Hamann, who also played in the Bundesliga, mainly for Bayern rival TSV 1860 München. Hamann enjoys cricket and once played for Alderley Edge CC 2nd XI vs Neston CC 2nd XI in the Cheshire County Cricket League, taking a catch in the game. He became interested in the sport during the 2005 Ashes series.

On 23 February 2010, the former German international was found guilty of Driving under the influence and sentenced to a 16-month driving ban while also being fined nearly £2,000. He had been stopped by police at junction six of the M56 near his home in Styal, Cheshire, at 12.15 am on 12 July 2009.

In cooperation with Standard Chartered Bank, an institution for which he also acted as an ambassador, Hamann hosted a football clinic in Nigeria.

In 2012, Hamann revealed the gambling problems he suffered towards the end of his career, an addiction that has been "not healthy or sustainable" and lasted for many years.

Hamann went to Australia on an extended holiday in 2018. In June 2019 he was charged with assault in the country.

Career statistics

Club

International

Scores and results list Germany's goal tally first, score column indicates score after each Hamann goal.

Managerial statistics

Honours
Bayern Munich
 Bundesliga: 1993–94, 1996–97
 DFB-Pokal: 1997–98
 DFB-Ligapokal: 1997
 UEFA Cup: 1995–96

Liverpool
FA Cup: 2000–01, 2005–06
League Cup: 2000–01, 2002–03; runner-up 2004–05
FA Charity Shield: 2001; runner-up 2002
UEFA Champions League: 2004–05
UEFA Cup: 2000–01
UEFA Super Cup: 2001, 2005
FIFA Club World Championship runner-up: 2005

Germany
 FIFA World Cup runner-up: 2002

Individual
FIFA World Cup All-Star Team: 2002 (reserve)
BBC Goal of the Season: 2003–04

References

External links

 
 
 
 
 
 
 LFC History Profile

1973 births
Living people
People from Tirschenreuth (district)
Sportspeople from the Upper Palatinate
Footballers from Bavaria
German footballers
Association football midfielders
FC Bayern Munich footballers
FC Bayern Munich II players
Newcastle United F.C. players
Liverpool F.C. players
Bolton Wanderers F.C. players
Manchester City F.C. players
Milton Keynes Dons F.C. players
TuS Haltern players
Bundesliga players
Premier League players
English Football League players
UEFA Cup winning players
UEFA Champions League winning players
Germany youth international footballers
Germany under-21 international footballers
Germany international footballers
1998 FIFA World Cup players
UEFA Euro 2000 players
2002 FIFA World Cup players
UEFA Euro 2004 players
German expatriate footballers
German expatriate sportspeople in England
Expatriate footballers in England
German football managers
Milton Keynes Dons F.C. non-playing staff
Leicester City F.C. non-playing staff
Stockport County F.C. managers
National League (English football) managers
German expatriate football managers
Expatriate football managers in England
FA Cup Final players
Association football coaches
West German footballers